The Girl and the Men (German: Das Mädchen und die Männer) is a 1919 German silent film directed by Manfred Noa and starring Paul Hartmann, Werner Krauss and Reinhold Schünzel.

Cast
In alphabetical order
 Hanne Brinkmann
 Else Bäck
 Alexander Ekert
 Paul Hartmann
 Werner Krauss
 Reinhold Schünzel
 Ferry Sikla
 Jan von Hagen

References

Bibliography
 Bock, Hans-Michael & Bergfelder, Tim. The Concise CineGraph. Encyclopedia of German Cinema. Berghahn Books, 2009.

External links

1919 films
Films of the Weimar Republic
German silent feature films
Films directed by Manfred Noa
German black-and-white films
1910s German films
Films shot at Terra Studios